Darko Perić (born 16 February 1978) is a Croatian retired football player who often plays as a right winger.

Career
Perić previously played for NK Zagreb and HNK Šibenik in the Croatian Prva HNL and KS Elbasani in Albania. He also had a spell with Austrian lower league outfit Kukmirn.

References

External links
 

1978 births
Living people
Association football wingers
Croatian footballers
NK Zagreb players
NK Zadar players
HNK Šibenik players
Győri ETO FC players
Zalaegerszegi TE players
NK HAŠK players
KF Elbasani players
NK Vinogradar players
Croatian Football League players
Nemzeti Bajnokság I players
Kategoria Superiore players
Austrian 2. Landesliga players
Croatian expatriate footballers
Expatriate footballers in Hungary
Croatian expatriate sportspeople in Hungary
Expatriate footballers in Albania
Croatian expatriate sportspeople in Albania
Expatriate footballers in Austria
Croatian expatriate sportspeople in Austria